Kathleen Smith (27 April 1927 – March 1998) was an English cricketer who played as a batter. She appeared in one Test match for England in 1960, against South Africa. She played domestic cricket for Kent. Smith died in Meopham, Kent in March 1998, at the age of 70.

References

External links
 
 

1927 births
1998 deaths
Cricketers from Sheffield
England women Test cricketers
Kent women cricketers